Oleg Lyashko (born October 13, 1982) is an Uzbek former swimmer, who specialized in butterfly events. Lyashko qualified for the men's 100 m butterfly at the 2004 Summer Olympics in Athens, by posting a FINA B-standard of 56.08 from the Kazakhstan Open Championships in Almaty. He challenged seven other swimmers in heat two, including 17-year-old Michal Rubáček of the Czech Republic. He raced to second place by a 1.03-second margin behind winner Rubacek in a personal best of 55.90. Lyashko failed to advance into the semifinals, as he placed forty-sixth overall in the preliminaries.

References

External links
NBC 2008 Olympics profile

1982 births
Living people
Sportspeople from Tashkent
Uzbekistani male butterfly swimmers
Olympic swimmers of Uzbekistan
Swimmers at the 2004 Summer Olympics
Swimmers at the 2006 Asian Games
Asian Games competitors for Uzbekistan
21st-century Uzbekistani people